Simone Colombo (born 28 August 1963) is a former professional tennis player from Italy.

During his career Colombo won five doubles titles and one singles title.  He achieved a career-high doubles ranking of World No. 68 in 1989, and a career high singles ranking of World No. 60 in 1986.

Colombo participated in 3 Davis Cup ties for Italy from 1987 to 1988, posting a 1–2 record in doubles and an 0–2 record in singles.

Career finals

Singles (1 title)

Doubles (5 titles, 1 runner-up)

External links
 
 
 

1963 births
Living people
Italian male tennis players
Tennis players from Milan
Mediterranean Games bronze medalists for Italy
Mediterranean Games medalists in tennis
Competitors at the 1983 Mediterranean Games